The Brisbane Lions' 1997 season was its first season in the Australian Football League (AFL) after its merger.

Season summary

Premiership Season

Home and away season

Finals series

Ladder

References

Brisbane Lions season, 1997
Brisbane Lions seasons